Peary Land is a peninsula in northern Greenland, extending into the Arctic Ocean. It reaches from Victoria Fjord in the west to Independence Fjord in the south and southeast, and to the Arctic Ocean in the north, with Cape Morris Jesup, the northernmost point of Greenland's mainland, and Cape Bridgman in the northeast.

History

Ancient settlements 

Peary Land was historically inhabited by three separate cultures, during which times the climate was milder than presently:
Independence I culture, Paleo-Eskimo (around 2000 BC, oldest remains dating from 2400 BC)
Independence II culture, Paleo-Eskimo (800 BC to 200 BC)
Thule culture (ancestral to the modern Inuit, around AD 1300)

Peary's explorations 

The area is named after Robert E. Peary, who first explored it during his expedition of 1891 to 1892.
Originally, Peary Land was believed to be an island, separated from the main island by the so-called Peary Channel, an assumed connection between Nordenskiöld Fjord and Independence Fjord which in fact did not exist. Ludvig Mylius-Erichsen (1872-1907), the ill-fated leader of the Denmark expedition, searched in vain for the Peary Channel in 1907 and was misled to his death by existing maps. Knud Rasmussen's First Thule Expedition confirmed in 1912 that Peary Land is a peninsula. There are more than 200 kilometers of dry land up to 1500 meters high between Nordenskiöld Fjord and Independence Fjord.

Research and mining
There are two Arctic research stations on Jørgen Brønlund Fjord, Brønlundhus (erected in 1948) and Cape Harald Moltke (erected in 1972). Both stations were built on the initiative of Eigil Knuth, and have been the basis for many scientific expeditions. Cape Harald Moltke station was built later in connection with use of the natural runway east of Jørgen Brønlund Fjord mouth. The stations are located 10 km from each other on either side of the fjord, with Brønlundhus on the western side, and communication between them in summer is by boat, depending on ice conditions. Since the death of Eigil Knuth, the stations have been administered by Peary Land Foundation. Today, Brønlundhus can be characterised as a museum, with a collection of artefacts from polar explorations.

In 1993 zinc and lead deposits were discovered in the Citronen Fjord. They are deemed the largest yet unexploited zinc deposits in the world, and the exploitation of the Citronen mine is in the preparation phase. Important zinc and barium deposits have also been found at Navarana Fjord.

Geography 
Peary Land is bounded by the Lincoln Sea (west of Cape Morris Jesup) and Wandel Sea of the Arctic Ocean in the north. Oodaaq island, the northernmost point of land of the world, lies off the north coast. Cape Eiler Rasmussen is the easternmost point. The coastline is deeply indented by smaller fjords, such as G.B. Schley Fjord and Hellefisk Fjord in the east, and Sands Fjord, Benedict Fjord, J.P. Koch Fjord, De Long Fjord and Weyprecht Fjord in the west. Børglum River, the largest river in Greenland, is located in Peary Land.

Peary Land is not part of any municipality, but belongs to the Northeast Greenland National Park.

Peary Land is not covered by an ice cap because the air is too dry to produce snow. Located mostly north of the 82°N parallel, it contains the most northerly ice-free region of the world, mostly in Southern Peary Land (such as Melville Land and Herlufsholm Strand) on the northern side of Independence Fjord. It was not covered by glaciers during the most recent ice age.

Mountains

Flora and fauna 
Musk oxen and Peary Land collared lemmings are supported by the sparse vegetation, which covers only about 5% of the surface, mostly in the area around Jørgen Brønlund Fjord. Other fauna includes Arctic fox, polar wolf, polar bear, and Arctic hare. In former times there were also caribou, but the last live caribou reported from Northern Greenland were seen in Hall Land in 1922.

The flora includes 33 species of flowering plants.

One to two million years ago, when climates were warmer, trees such as larch, black spruce, birch, yew, and thuja grew in northernmost Peary Land.

References

External links
Exploration of Northern Greenland
North America, Greenland, Roosevelt Range, J.V. Jensen Land, Avanarsuasua, Exploration

Fjords of Greenland